Strange Suzy is a 1941 French comedy film directed by Pierre-Jean Ducis and starring Suzy Prim, Claude Dauphin and Marguerite Moreno.

Made in the southern zone of Vichy France, the film was a commercial success. Along with another hit The Well Digger's Daughter, it was banned by the Nazi authorities in the Occupied Zone in retaliation for a Vichy ban on the German film Bel Ami.

Cast
 Suzy Prim as Suzy 
 Claude Dauphin as Jacques Hébert 
 Marguerite Moreno as La tante 
 Albert Préjean as Henri Berger 
 Pierre Stéphen as Joseph 
 Gaby André as Aline 
 Fernand Charpin
 Marcel Delaître
 Lisette Didier
 Lysiane Rey
 Marthe Sarbel
 Jacques Tarride

References

Bibliography 
 Noël Burch & Geneviève Sellier. The Battle of the Sexes in French Cinema, 1930–1956. Duke University Press, 2013.
 Winkel, Roel Vande & Welch, David. Cinema and the Swastika: The International Expansion of Third Reich Cinema. Palgrave MacMillan, 2011.

External links 
 

1941 films
French comedy films
1941 comedy films
1940s French-language films
Films directed by Pierre-Jean Ducis
French black-and-white films
1940s French films